Vadodara City is one of the 182 Legislative Assembly constituencies of Gujarat state in India. It is part of Vadodara district and is reserved for candidates belonging to the Scheduled Castes. This seat came into existence after 2008 delimitation.

List of segments

This assembly seat represents the following segments,

 Vadodara Taluka (Part) – Vadodara Municipal Corporation (Part) Ward No. – 2, 9, Harni (OG) 13, Sayajipura (OG) 15, Bapod (OG) 16 .

Member of Legislative Assembly

Election results

2022

'

2017

2012

See also
 List of constituencies of the Gujarat Legislative Assembly
 Vadodara district

References

External links
 

Assembly constituencies of Gujarat
Vadodara district